Pappu Can't Dance Saala is a 2011 Indian romantic comedy film written and directed by Saurabh Shukla. The film stars Vinay Pathak and Neha Dhupia, whilst Rajat Kapoor, Naseeruddin Shah, Sanjay Mishra, and Saurabh Shukla play supporting roles. The film released on 16 December 2011.

The title of the film is taken from a song of the same name, from the film Jaane Tu... Ya Jaane Na (July 4, 2008).

Cast 
 Vinay Pathak as Vidyadhar Acharya
 Neha Dhupia as Mehak Malvade
 Rajat Kapoor as music album director
 Naseeruddin Shah as Vidyadhar's father
 Sanjay Mishra as street food shop owner
 Saurabh Shukla as producer of dance album
 Brijendra Kala as Nagesh
 Anand Abhyankar

Synopsis 
The film revolves around a man Vidyadhar Acharya (Vinay Pathak), who moves to Mumbai from Varanasi, and finds it difficult to adjust to a place away from his city that's rich with cultural heritage.

Acharya rents a flat in an apartment only meant for Sales tax employees. Every now and then, a vigilance raid occurs in the apartment and then he has to hide in the terrace and stay there all night. Mehak Malavde (Neha Dupia), a struggling dancer moves in as his neighbor. The two neighbours regularly have fights. One night, there is another vigilance raid on the apartment. Mehak gets caught and gets thrown out of her flat. Vidya manages to escape since he came home late that night. Having nowhere to go, Mehak breaks into Vidya's apartment and plans to live there. Since Vidya hates her, it becomes impossible for him to stay with her, but she gives him no options.

Slowly, they start liking each other. One night, they both have a bad fight and Vidya leaves his job and returns to his hometown. Mehak also moves out and starts living in a new flat. Slowly, they realize that they are missing each other and decide to unite by the end of the movie.

Reception 
The film opened to mixed reviews, although the performances of the lead cast were praised. At the box office it recorded decent collections as it faced tough competition from other strong releases, The Dirty Picture which was going strong in its third week & Don 2.

Soundtrack 
Soundtrack for the film is scored by Malhar. Lyrics Penned By Amitabh Bhattacharya, Saurabh Shukla.

References

External links 
 
 

2010s Hindi-language films
Indian romantic comedy films
2011 romantic comedy films
2011 films